Dale Marshall may refer to:

 Dale Marshall (politician) (born 1963), Barbadian politician
 Dale Marshall (painter) (born 1974), British painter
 Dale Rogers Marshall (born 1937), American political scientist and academic administrator